2009 Regional League Division 2 Central & Eastern Region ( or ไทยลีกดิวิชัน 2 ภาคกลางและภาคตะวันออก) is the 3rd Level League in Thailand. In 2009, contains 12 clubs from Central & Eastern region.

Stadium and locations

Final league table

Results

See also
2009 Regional League Division 2 North Eastern Region
2009 Regional League Division 2 Northern Region
2009 Regional League Division 2 Bangkok Metropolitan Region
2009 Regional League Division 2 Southern Region

References

External links
 Football Association of Thailand

Regional League Central-East Division seasons
Cen